Jag ska aldrig lämna dig is a 1993 studio album from Swedish country and pop singer Kikki Danielsson. The songwriters Mikael Wendt and Christer Lundh had travelled to India to get inspiration for the record.

Track listing

Contributing musicians
Kikki Danielsson, vocals
Lasse Wellander, guitar
Peter Ljung, keyboard
Rutger Gunnarsson, bass
Klas Anderhell, percussion, drums
Hasse Rosén, guitar, banjo

Svensktoppen
The ballad Som en sol from the album charted on Svensktoppen for seven weeks during the period August 28-October 9, 1993, where it peaked at #7.
The song Jag ska aldrig lämna dig charted on Svensktoppen for four weeks during the period June 4–25, 1994, where it peaked at #4.

References

1993 albums
Kikki Danielsson albums
Swedish-language albums